Virginia Repertory Theatre is a professional theatre company based in Richmond, Virginia. It was created in 2012 when Barksdale Theatre and Theatre IV, which had shared one staff for over a decade, merged to become one company. With an annual budget of over $5 million, the theatre employs over 240 artists annually and presents seasons at the November Theatre (formerly the Empire Theatre) and Theatre Gym at Virginia Rep Center, as well as productions at the Hanover Tavern and The Children's Theatre in The Shops at Willow Lawn. It is currently run under the leadership of Managing Director Phil Whiteway.

In 2012, Sara Belle and Neil November made a $2 million gift for restoration, and the Empire Theatre was renamed the Sara Belle and Neil November Theatre.

History 
Virginia Repertory Theatre was created by the merger of Barksdale Theatre and Theatre IV in July 2012 to form one of the largest performing arts organizations in Central Virginia.

Barksdale Theatre's history 
On August 1, 1953, six actors, two children, a dog and two pigs moved into a historic ruin called Hanover Tavern. The transplanted New Yorkers founded Central Virginia's first professional theatre, and named the company in memory of a deceased college friend, Barbara Barksdale.

The team created the nation's first dinner theatre. They lived upstairs, performed downstairs, and served meals. During the first six years, four of the original founders moved on, leaving Pete Kilgore, Muriel McAuley and newcomer (and newly-wed) Nancy Kilgore firmly in charge. In the seasons that followed, Barksdale produced Greater Richmond's first professional productions of plays by Tennessee Williams, Arthur Miller, Eugene O'Neill, George Bernard Shaw, Noel Coward, Thornton Wilder, William Inge and Edward Albee.

Barksdale was Virginia's first performing arts organization to open its doors to integrated audiences. In 1973, Barksdale produced Virginia's first professional play based on African American experience, Lorraine Hansberry's To Be Young, Gifted and Black.

In 1990, the Tavern was sold to the Hanover Tavern Foundation. In 1993, Pete, Muriel and Nancy retired.

Barksdale Theatre and Theatre IV began sharing a single staff in 2001, but operated as two separate nonprofit theatres. After a ten-year separation, Barksdale returned theatrical programming to Hanover Tavern in January 2006, renting the space from the Hanover Tavern Foundation to complement its five-play Signature Season at Willow Lawn. Today, productions at the Tavern are ongoing as part of Virginia Rep's Hanover Tavern Season.

Theatre IV's history 
Theatre IV was founded in 1975 as Virginia's first professional theatre for young audiences. It focused on four areas: the arts, education, children's health and safety, and community leadership.

For over 30 years, Theatre IV performed in every school district in Virginia and toured regularly to major performing arts centers throughout 32 states on the eastern half of the nation. The touring arm continues today as Virginia Rep on Tour.

Over the years Theatre IV produced many educational plays to address social issues. In 1983, in partnership with the Virginia Department of Social Services and Prevent Child Abuse Virginia, Theatre IV created and began touring Hugs and Kisses, Virginia's principal child sexual abuse prevention program. Since that time, Hugs and Kisses has been presented to over 1.5 million children in every school district statewide. Over 15,000 Virginia children have come forward for more information or help after seeing a performance of Hugs and Kisses.

In 1985 Theatre IV produced Do Lord Remember Me based on the oral histories of former slaves interviewed during the Federal Writer's Project, and received the Award of Excellence from Branches of the Arts for "The most outstanding play relating to African-American experience."

In 1986, Theatre IV purchased and renovated the historic November Theatre (formerly the Empire), one of Richmond's two Broadway style houses. This historic theater opened in 1911 for stock and vaudeville performances.  In 1915 it changed its name from the Empire to the Strand and continued under that name until damaged by fire in 1927.  It reopened in 1933 as the "Booker T," and for many years served as the leading black movie house when Richmond was segregated.  It closed in 1974 and was idle until real estate developer Mitchell Kambis rescued and renovated it.  Kambis restored the Empire name and in 1979 leased it to Keith Fowler, artistic director of the American Revels Company.

Revels restored live professional theater to downtown Richmond.  Revels was succeeded by Theatre IV in 1984.
On its 100th anniversary in 2011 the theater was further restored when Sara Belle and Neil November made a $2 million gift to Theatre IV and Barksdale. The November now serves as Virginia Rep's headquarters and home and anchors the Arts District.

Barksdale Theatre and Theatre IV began sharing a single staff in 2001, but operated as two separate nonprofit theatres. Barksdale returned theatrical programming to Hanover Tavern in January 2006, renting the space from the Hanover Tavern Foundation

In 2002 the Pentagon selected Theatre IV's production of Buffalo Soldier as a morale booster after September 11. Theatre IV became the first professional theatre in the nation to perform within the Pentagon walls.

Virginia Rep today 
With a budget of $5 million, four distinct venues, an educational touring arm, and an annual audience over 550,000, Virginia Rep is the largest professional theatre and one of the largest performing arts organizations in Central Virginia.

References

External links
 Virginia Repertory Theatre

Organizations based in Richmond, Virginia
Hanover County, Virginia
Theatres in Richmond, Virginia
Theatre companies in Virginia
Touring theatre